Calocosmus venustus is a species of beetle in the family Cerambycidae. It was described by Chevrolat in 1838. It is known from the Bahamas, Cuba, and Jamaica.

References

Calocosmus
Beetles described in 1838